Halgerda batangas is a species of sea slug, a dorid nudibranch, a shell-less marine gastropod mollusk in the family Discodorididae.

Distribution 
This species was described from the Philippines, with a holotype specimen measuring 40 mm in length, alive, from Mactan Island, Cebu and a paratype measuring 35 mm from Anilao, Batangas. It is found in the tropical western Pacific, including: Indonesia, Philippines, Solomon Islands, Mabul, New Britain, Davao Gulf, Malaysia, Papua New Guinea, Sulawesi, Great Barrier Reef and Taiwan.

Description
This animal is one of a group of mainly white species of Halgerda with orange markings. It is characterized by a network of fine, solid, red-orange lines on the mantle. It has a white band around the mantle containing low rounded orange-capped tubercles. The mantle tubercles range in size from small rounded bumps to tall, prominent structures.

References

External links
 

Discodorididae
Gastropods described in 2000